"Black or White" is a 1991 single by American singer Michael Jackson.

Black or White may also refer to:
 Black or White (film), a 2014 American drama film
 "Black or White" (Steve Harley & Cockney Rebel song), a 1975 song by British rock band Steve Harley & Cockney Rebel
 "Black or White", a song by Dreamcatcher from Dystopia: The Tree of Language

See also
 Black-or-white fallacy, a type of false dilemma
 Black or white thinking or splitting, in psychology
 Black and White (disambiguation)
 Black on white (disambiguation)